Mitrella neocaledonica is a species of sea snail, a marine gastropod mollusk in the family Columbellidae, the dove snails.

Description
The length of the shell attains 5.5 mm.

Distribution
This marine species occurs off New Caledonia

References

 Monsecour, K.; Monsecour, D. (2016). Deep-water Columbellidae (Mollusca: Gastropoda) from New Caledonia. in: Héros, V. et al. (Ed.) Tropical Deep-Sea Benthos 29. Mémoires du Muséum national d'Histoire naturelle (1993). 208: 291-362.

External links
 

neocaledonica
Gastropods described in 2016